Municipal de Vitacura Airport  is a general aviation airport in Vitacura, a northern suburb of the Santiago Metropolitan Region of Chile. The airport is in a narrow slot between a major city street in Vitacura and a parallel freeway.

Runway 25 has an additional  displaced threshold. There is nearby mountainous terrain northwest through northeast.

See also

Transport in Chile
List of airports in Chile

References

External links
OpenStreetMap - Vitacura Airport
OurAirports - Vitacura Airport
SkyVector - Vitacura Airport

Airports in Chile
Airports in Santiago Metropolitan Region